A Mis Reinas (To My Queens) is an album by the Mexican singer Patricia Manterola that was released in 2006. The album includes remakes of her favourite childhood songs.

Track listing
 "De Mí Enamórate"
 "Cómo Te Va Mi Amor"
 "Devorame Otra Vez"
 "Maldita Primavera"
 "Cheque En Blanco"
 "El Me Mintio"
 "No Controles"
 "Mentiras"
 "Acariciame"
 "Me Gustas Mucho"
 "Quién Como Tú"
 "Abrazame"

Patricia Manterola albums
2006 albums